Macrosoma rubedinaria is a moth-like butterfly in the family Hedylidae. It was described by Francis Walker in 1862.

References

Hedylidae
Butterflies described in 1862